Moldova, officially the Republic of Moldova, is a country in southeastern Europe.

Moldova or Moldavia may also refer to:

Places

Historical

 Moldavia, a geographic and historical region, and former principality in Eastern Europe (1346–1859)
 Moldavia (region of Romania), one of the four historical regions in contemporary Romania
 Moldavian Democratic Republic, a short-lived state (1917–1918)
 Moldavian ASSR, an autonomous Soviet republic within Ukrainian SSR (1924–1940)
 Moldavian SSR, a republic of the Soviet Union (1940–1941 / 1944–1991)

Other places
 Moldova Nouă, a town in Caraș-Severin County, Romania
 Moldova, Estonia, a village in Lüganuse Parish, Ida-Viru County, Estonia
 Moldova (river), a river in eastern Romania

Ships
 RMS Moldavia, British steam ship, as HMS Moldavia sunk during World War I 
 MV Anne Scan, a Slovenian-built cargo ship also known as Moldavia

Other uses
 Moldova (newspaper), a Romanian newspaper in the 1930s
 Editura Moldova, a Moldovan publishing house; See List of Romanian-language publishers
 2419 Moldavia, an asteroid discovered in 1974

See also
 Moldavians (disambiguation)
 Moldovan (disambiguation)
 Moldava (disambiguation)
 Moldau (disambiguation)